The Nationalist Liberation Alliance (Spanish: Alianza Libertadora Nacionalista, ALN), originally known as the Argentine Civic Legion (Legión Cívica Argentina, LCA) from 1931 to 1937, the Alliance of Nationalist Youth (Alianza de la Juventud Nacionalista, AJN) from 1937 to 1943, and then using its final name from 1943 to 1955, was a Nacionalista and fascist movement.

The movement was heavily influenced by fascism and later became influenced by nazism, with its members utilizing the Roman salute, wearing fascist-style uniforms, and marching in military formation. The movement's declaration of principles in 1931 attacked Marxism and democracy and declared support for the creation of a corporatist state like that of Fascist Italy. It cooperated with the Argentine Fascist Party, particularly in the Córdoba region of Argentina. In Córdoba in 1935, the local militia allied with the Argentine Fascist Party and Argentine Nationalist Action to form the Frente de Fuerzas Fascistas de Córdoba, which was replaced by the National Fascist Union in 1936. In 1936, its leader General Juan Bautista Molina reorganized the militia to be based upon the organization of the Nazi Party. General Molina wanted an Argentina based on Nazi lines, presenting himself as an Argentine Hitler, and having close relations with Nazi Germany.
The movement called for "hierarchy and order" in society, various xenophobic and anti-Semitic themes, and the demand for "social justice" and "revolutionary" land reform to destroy the "oligarchy" in Argentina. The movement also advocated irredentism against the country's neighbors Uruguay, Paraguay, Chile, Bolivia and Brazil.

It was violently anti-Semitic, with its journal Combate issuing a "commandment" to its members: "War against the Jew. Hatred towards the Jew. Death to the Jew."

History 

It was recognized as a political entity on 20 May 1931 and received juridical personality on 11 January 1932. The movement was formed by Argentine President General José Félix Uriburu officially as a reserve for Argentina's armed forces. The movement's members were authorized to receive military training. The Legion declared itself to be made up of "patriotic men" who embodied "the spirit of the September revolution and who morally and materially were ready to cooperate in the institutional reconstruction of the country". The Legion was the largest nationalist organization in Argentina in the early 1930s. The movement is known to have committed acts of violence against its political opponents and tortured those that were captured. It collapsed in 1955 after anti-Peronist forces seized control of Argentina with its leader fleeing the country.

It had a student wing called the Nationalist Union of Secondary Students (Unión Nacionalista de Estudiantes Secundarios, UNES). Unlike other Argentine nationalist organizations of the time, the Legion had a women's section, while other nationalist groups excluded women from their organizations. The Legion's women section called Agrupación Femenina de la LCA promoted women to love the armed forces and respect for order, authority, and hierarchy in the home and school. These women were to provide aid to the poor to assist in establishing social peace.

During the 1946 Argentine elections, the ALN was the largest Nacionalista movement but only gained 25,000 votes in a few areas in which it fielded candidates. This coincided with the election of Juan Perón as President of Argentina. Following the 1946 election, ALN members attacked the headquarters of several liberal and leftist newspapers, including La Hora, the Communist Party newspaper, as well as attacking a bar in downtown Buenos Aires that was frequented by Spanish republican refugees.

In 1953, the ALN condemned the nationalist newspaper La Prensa for publishing too many articles by Jewish writers. ALN leader Juan Queraltó was ousted from leadership of the party in 1953. Queraltó was succeeded by Guillermo Patricio Kelly. Kelly sought to distance the party from its anti-Semitic past and met with Israel's ambassador to Argentina, Dr. Arie Kubovy during which Kelly informed Dr. Kubovy that the ALN had forsworn anti-Semitism. In 1954, anti-Semitism was dropped from the party. Kelly was arrested after the anti-Perónist Revolución Libertadora of 1955 by Argentine authorities for having used a forged passport, but managed to escape and flee the country in 1957.

Party symbols 
The Nationalist Liberation Alliance used the Andean condor as the symbol of the movement. The Andean condor is a national symbol of Argentina.

See also
Peronism

References 

Antisemitism in Argentina
Fascism in Argentina
Nazi parties
Defunct political parties in Argentina
Political parties established in 1931
1931 establishments in Argentina
Political parties disestablished in 1955
1955 disestablishments in Argentina
Neo-Nazism in Argentina
Banned far-right parties
Anti-Chilean sentiment